Radar in World War II greatly influenced many important aspects of the conflict. This revolutionary new technology of radio-based detection and tracking was used by both the Allies and Axis powers in World War II,  which had evolved independently in a number of nations during the mid 1930s. At the outbreak of war in September 1939, both Great Britain and Germany had functioning radar systems. In Great Britain, it was called RDF, Range and Direction Finding, while in Germany the name Funkmeß (radio-measuring) was used, with apparatuses called Funkmessgerät (radio measuring device).
By the time of the Battle of Britain in mid-1940, the Royal Air Force (RAF) had fully integrated RDF as part of the national air defence.

In the United States, the technology was demonstrated during December 1934, although it was only when war became likely that the U.S. recognized the potential of the new technology, and began development of ship- and land-based systems. The first of these were fielded by the U.S. Navy in early 1940, and a year later by the U.S. Army. The acronym RADAR (for Radio Detection And Ranging) was coined by the U.S. Navy in 1940, and the term "radar" became widely used.

While the benefits of operating in the microwave portion of the radio spectrum were known, transmitters for generating microwave signals of sufficient power were unavailable; thus, all early radar systems operated at lower frequencies (e.g., HF or VHF). In February 1940, Great Britain developed the resonant-cavity magnetron, capable of producing microwave power in the kilowatt range, opening the path to second-generation radar systems.

After the Fall of France, it was realised in Great Britain that the manufacturing capabilities of the United States were vital to success in the war; thus, although America was not yet a belligerent, Prime Minister Winston Churchill directed that the technological secrets of Great Britain be shared in exchange for the needed capabilities. In the summer of 1940, the Tizard Mission visited the United States. The cavity magnetron was demonstrated to Americans at RCA, Bell Labs, etc. It was 100 times more powerful than anything they had seen. Bell Labs was able to duplicate the performance, and the Radiation Laboratory at MIT was established to develop microwave radars. The magnetron was later described by American military scientists as "the most valuable cargo ever brought to our shores".

In addition to Great Britain, Germany, and the United States, wartime radars were also developed and used by Australia, Canada, France, Italy, Japan, New Zealand, South Africa, the Soviet Union, and Sweden.

United Kingdom
Research leading to RDF technology in the United Kingdom was begun by Sir Henry Tizard's Aeronautical Research Committee in early 1935, responding to the urgent need to counter German bomber attacks. Robert A. Watson-Watt at the Radio Research Station, Slough, was asked to investigate a radio-based "death ray". In response, Watson-Watt and his scientific assistant, Arnold F. Wilkins, replied that it might be more practical to use radio to detect and track enemy aircraft. On 26 February 1935, a preliminary test, commonly called the Daventry Experiment, showed that radio signals reflected from an aircraft could be detected. Research funds were quickly allocated, and a development project was started in great secrecy on the Orford Ness Peninsula in Suffolk. E. G. Bowen was responsible for developing the pulsed transmitter. On 17 June 1935, the research apparatus successfully detected an aircraft at a distance of 17 miles. In August, A. P. Rowe, representing the Tizard Committee, suggested the technology be code-named RDF, meaning Range and Direction Finding.

Air Ministry

In March 1936, the RDF research and development effort was moved to the Bawdsey Research Station located at Bawdsey Manor in Suffolk. While this operation was under the Air Ministry, the Army and Navy became involved and soon initiated their own programs.

At Bawdsey, engineers and scientists evolved the RDF technology, but Watson-Watt, the head of the team, turned from the technical side to developing a practical machine/human user interface. After watching a demonstration in which operators were attempting to locate an "attacking" bomber, he noticed that the primary problem was not technological, but information management and interpretation. Following Watson-Watt's advice, by early 1940, the RAF had built up a layered control organization that efficiently passed information along the chain of command, and was able to track large numbers of aircraft and direct interceptors to them.

Immediately after the war began in September 1939, the Air Ministry RDF development at Bawdsey was temporarily relocated to University College, Dundee in Scotland. A year later, the operation moved to near Worth Matravers in Dorset on the southern coast of England, and was named the Telecommunications Research Establishment (TRE). In a final move, the TRE relocated to Malvern College in Great Malvern.

Some of the major RDF/radar equipment used by the Air Ministry is briefly described. All of the systems were given the official designation Air Ministry Experimental Station (AMES) plus a Type number; most of these are listed in this link.

Chain Home

Shortly before the outbreak of World War II, several RDF (radar) stations in a system known as Chain Home (or CH) were constructed along the South and East coasts of Britain, based on the successful model at Bawdsey. CH was a relatively simple system. The transmitting side comprised two 300-ft (90-m)-tall steel towers strung with a series of antennas between them. A second set of 240-ft (73-m)-tall wooden towers was used for reception, with a series of crossed antennas at various heights up to 215 ft (65 m). Most stations had more than one set of each antenna, tuned to operate at different frequencies.

Typical CH operating parameters were:
 Frequency: 20 to 30 megahertz (MHz) (15 to 10 metres)
 Peak power: 350 kilowatt (kW) (later 750 kW)
 Pulse repetition frequency: 25 and 12.5 pps
 Pulse length: 20 microseconds (μs)

CH output was read with an oscilloscope. When a pulse was sent from the broadcast towers, a visible line travelled horizontally across the screen very rapidly. The output from the receiver was amplified and fed into the vertical axis of the scope, so a return from an aircraft would deflect the beam upward. This formed a spike on the display, and the distance from the left side – measured with a small scale on the bottom of the screen – would give target range. By rotating the receiver goniometer connected to the antennas, the operator could estimate the direction to the target (this was the reason for the cross shaped antennas), while the height of the vertical displacement indicated formation size. By comparing the strengths returned from the various antennas up the tower, altitude could be gauged with some accuracy.

CH proved highly effective during the Battle of Britain, and was critical in enabling the RAF to defeat the much larger Luftwaffe forces. Whereas the Luftwaffe relied on, often out of date, reconnaissance data and fighter sweeps, the RAF knew with a high degree of accuracy Luftwaffe formation strengths and intended targets. The sector stations were able to send the required number of interceptors, often only in small numbers. CH acted as a force multiplier, allowing the husbanding of resources, both human and material, and only needing to scramble when attack was imminent. This greatly reduced pilot and aircraft fatigue.

Very early in the battle, the Luftwaffe made a series of small but effective raids on several stations, including Ventnor, but they were repaired quickly. In the meantime, the operators broadcast radar-like signals from neighbouring stations in order to fool the Germans that coverage continued. The Germans' attacks were sporadic and short-lived. The German High Command apparently never understood the importance of radar to the RAF's efforts, or they would have assigned these stations a much higher priority. Greater disruption was caused by destroying the teletype and landline links of the vulnerable above-ground control huts and the power cables to the masts than by attacking the open latticework towers themselves.

To avoid the CH system, the Luftwaffe adopted other tactics. One was to approach the coastline at very low altitude. This had been anticipated and was countered to some degree with a series of shorter-range stations built right on the coast, known as Chain Home Low (CHL). These systems had been intended for naval gun-laying and known as Coastal Defence (CD), but their narrow beams also meant that they could sweep an area much closer to the ground without "seeing" the reflection of the ground or water – known as clutter. Unlike the larger CH systems, the CHL broadcast antenna and receiver had to be rotated; this was done manually on a pedal-crank system by members of the WAAF until the system was motorised in 1941.

Ground-Controlled Intercept

Systems similar to CH were later adapted with a new display to produce the Ground-Controlled Intercept (GCI) stations in January 1941. In these systems, the antenna was rotated mechanically, followed by the display on the operator's console. That is, instead of a single line across the bottom of the display from left to right, the line was rotated around the screen at the same speed as the antenna was turning.

The result was a 2-D display of the air space around the station with the operator in the middle, with all the aircraft appearing as dots in the proper location in space. Called plan position indicators (PPI), these simplified the amount of work needed to track a target on the operator's part. Philo Taylor Farnsworth refined a version of his picture tube (cathode ray tube, or CRT) and called it an "Iatron". It could store an image for milliseconds to minutes (even hours). One version that kept an image alive about a second before fading, proved to be a useful addition to the evolution of radar. This slow-to-fade display tube was used by air traffic controllers from the very beginning of radar.

Airborne Intercept

The Luftwaffe took to avoiding intercepting fighters by flying at night and in bad weather. Although the RAF control stations were aware of the location of the bombers, there was little they could do about them unless fighter pilots made visual contact.

This problem had already been foreseen, and a successful programme, started in 1936 by Edward George Bowen, developed a miniaturized RDF system suitable for aircraft, the on-board Airborne Interception Radar (AI) set (Watson-Watt called the CH sets the RDF-1 and the AI the RDF-2A). Initial AI sets were first made available to the RAF in 1939 and fitted to Bristol Blenheim aircraft (replaced quickly by Bristol Beaufighters). These measures greatly increased Luftwaffe loss rates.

Later in the war, British Mosquito night intruder aircraft were fitted with AI Mk VIII and later derivatives, which with Serrate allowed them to track down German night fighters from their Lichtenstein signal emissions, as well as a device named Perfectos that tracked German IFF. As a countermeasure, the German night fighters employed Naxos ZR radar signal detectors.

Air-Surface Vessel

While testing the AI radars near Bawdsey Manor, Bowen's team noticed the radar generated strong returns from ships and docks. This was due to the vertical sides of the objects, which formed excellent partial corner reflectors, allowing detection at several miles range. The team focussed on this application for much of 1938.

The Air-Surface Vessel Mark I, using electronics similar to those of the AI sets, was the first aircraft-carried radar to enter service, in early 1940. It was quickly replaced by the improved Mark II, which included side-scanning antennas that allowed the aircraft to sweep twice the area in a single pass. The later ASV Mk. II had the power needed to detect submarines on the surface, eventually making such operations suicidal.

Centimetric
The improvements to the cavity magnetron by John Randall and Harry Boot of Birmingham University in early 1940 marked a major advance in radar capability. The resulting magnetron was a small device that generated high-power microwave frequencies and allowed the development of practical centimetric radar that operated in the SHF radio frequency band from 3 to 30 GHz (wavelengths of 10 to 1 cm). Centimetric radar enables the detection of much smaller objects and the use of much smaller antennas than the earlier, lower frequency radars. A radar with a wavelength of 2 meters (VHF band, 150 MHz) cannot detect objects that are much smaller than 2 meters and requires an antenna whose size is on the order of 2 meters (an awkward size for use on aircraft). In contrast, a radar with a 10 cm wavelength can detect objects 10 cm in size with a reasonably-sized antenna.

In addition a tuneable local oscillator and a mixer for the receiver were essential. These were targeted developments, the former by R W Sutton who developed the NR89 reflex klystron, or "Sutton tube". The latter by H W B Skinner who developed the 'cat's whisker' crystal.

At the end of 1939 when the decision was made to develop 10 cm radar, there were no suitable active devices available - no high power magnetron, no reflex klystron, no proven microwave crystal mixer, and no TR cell. By mid-1941, Type 271, the first Naval S-band radar, was in operational use.

The cavity magnetron was perhaps the single most important invention in the history of radar. In the Tizard Mission during September 1940, it was given free to the U.S., along with other inventions, such as jet technology, in exchange for American R&D and production facilities; the British urgently needed to produce the magnetron in large quantities. Edward George Bowen was attached to the mission as the RDF lead. This led to the creation of the Radiation Laboratory (Rad Lab) based at MIT to further develop the device and usage. Half of the radars deployed during World War II were designed at the Rad Lab, including over 100 different systems costing US$1.5 billion.

When the cavity magnetron was first developed, its use in microwave RDF sets was held up because the duplexers for VHF were destroyed by the new higher-powered transmitter. This problem was solved in early 1941 by the transmit-receive (T-R) switch developed at the Clarendon Laboratory of Oxford University, allowing a pulse transmitter and receiver to share the same antenna without affecting the receiver.

The combination of magnetron, T-R switch, small antenna and high resolution allowed small, powerful radars to be installed in aircraft. Maritime patrol aircraft could detect objects as small as submarine periscopes, allowing aircraft to track and attack submerged submarines, where before only surfaced submarines could be detected. However, according to the latest reports on the history U.S. Navy periscope detection  the first minimal possibilities for periscope detection appeared only during 50's and 60's and the problem was not completely solved even on the turn of the millennium. In addition, radar could detect the submarine at a much greater range than visual observation, not only in daylight but at night, when submarines had previously been able to surface and recharge their batteries safely. Centimetric contour mapping radars such as H2S, and the even higher-frequency American-created H2X, allowed new tactics in the strategic bombing campaign. Centimetric gun-laying radars were much more accurate than older technology; radar improved Allied naval gunnery and, together with the proximity fuze, made anti-aircraft guns much more effective. The two new systems used by anti-aircraft batteries are credited with destroying many V-1 flying bombs in the late summer of 1944.

British Army
During Air Ministry RDF development in Bawdsey, an Army detachment was attached to initiate its own projects. These programmes were for a Gun Laying (GL) system to assist aiming antiaircraft guns and searchlights and a Coastal Defense (CD) system for directing coastal artillery. The Army detachment included W. A. S. Butement and P. E. Pollard who, in 1930, demonstrated a radio-based detection apparatus that was not further pursued by the Army.

When war started and Air Ministry activities were relocated to Dundee, the Army detachment became part of a new developmental centre at Christchurch in Dorset. John D. Cockcroft, a physicist from Cambridge University, who was awarded a Nobel Prize after the war for work in nuclear physics, became Director. With its greater remit, the facility became the Air Defence Research and Development Establishment (ADRDE) in mid-1941. A year later, the ADRDE relocated to Great Malvern, in Worcestershire. In 1944, this was redesignated the Radar Research and Development Establishment (RRDE).

Transportable Radio Unit
While at Bawdsey, the Army detachment developed a Gun Laying ("GL") system termed Transportable Radio Unit (TRU). Pollard was project leader. Operating at 60 MHz (6-m) with 50-kW power, the TRU had two vans for the electronic equipment and a generator van; it used a 105-ft portable tower to support a transmitting antenna and two receiving antennas. A prototype was tested in October 1937, detecting aircraft at 60-miles range; production of 400 sets designated GL Mk. I began in June 1938. The Air Ministry adopted some of these sets to augment the CH network in case of enemy damage.

GL Mk. I sets were used overseas by the British Army in Malta and Egypt in 1939–40. Seventeen sets were sent to France with the British Expeditionary Force; while most  were destroyed at the Dunkirk evacuation in late May 1940, a few were captured intact, giving the Germans an opportunity to examine British RDF kit. An improved version, GL Mk. II, was used throughout the war; some 1,700 sets were put into service, including over 200 supplied to the Soviet Union. Operational research found that anti-aircraft guns using GL averaged 4,100 rounds fired per hit, compared with about 20,000 rounds for predicted fire using a conventional director.

Coastal Defence
In early 1938, Alan Butement began the development of a Coastal Defence (CD) system that involved some of the most advanced features in the evolving technology. The 200 MHz transmitter and receiver already being developed for the AI and ASV sets of the Air Defence were used, but, since the CD would not be airborne, more power and a much larger antenna were possible. Transmitter power was increased to 150 kW. This "broadside" array was rotated 1.5 revolutions per minute, sweeping a field covering 360 degrees. Lobe switching was incorporated in the transmitting array, giving high directional accuracy. To analyze system capabilities, Butement formulated the first mathematical relationship that later became the well-known "radar range equation".

Although initially intended for detecting and directing fire at surface vessels, early tests showed that the CD set had much better capabilities for detecting aircraft at low altitudes than the existing Chain Home. Consequently, CD was also adopted by the RAF to augment the CH stations; in this role, it was designated Chain Home Low (CHL).

Centimetric gun-laying
When the cavity magnetron became practicable, the ADEE co-operated with TRE in utilising it in an experimental 20 cm GL set. This was first tested and found to be too fragile for army field use. The ADEE became the ADRDE in early 1941, and started the development of the GL3B. All of the equipment, including the power generator, was contained in a protected trailer, topped with two 6-foot dish transmitting and receiving antennas on a rotating base, as the transmit-receive (T-R) switch allowing a single antenna to perform both functions had not yet been perfected. Similar microwave gun-laying systems were being developed in Canada (the GL3C) and in America (eventually designated SCR-584). Although about 400 of the GL3B sets were manufactured, it was the American version that was most numerous in the defense of London during the V-1 attacks.

Royal Navy

The Experimental Department of His Majesty's Signal School (HMSS) had been present at early demonstrations of the work conducted at Orfordness and Bawdsey Manor. Located at Portsmouth in Hampshire, the Experimental Department had an independent capability for developing wireless valves (vacuum tubes), and had provided the tubes used by Bowden in the transmitter at Orford Ness. With excellent research facilities of its own, the Admiralty-based its RDF development at the HMSS. This remained in Portsmouth until 1942, when it was moved inland to safer locations at Witley and Haslemere in Surrey. These two operations became the Admiralty Signal Establishment (ASE).

A few representative radars are described. Note that the type numbers are not sequential by date.

Surface Warning/Gun Control
The Royal Navy's first successful RDF was the Type 79Y Surface Warning, tested at sea in early 1938. John D. S. Rawlinson was the project director. This 43-MHz (7-m), 70-kW set used fixed transmitting and receiving antennas and had a range of 30 to 50 miles, depending on the antenna heights. By 1940, this became the Type 281, increased in frequency to 85 MHz (3.5 m) and power to between 350 and 1,000 kW, depending on the pulse width. With steerable antennas, it was also used for Gun Control. This was first used in combat in March 1941 with considerable success. Type 281B used a common transmitting and receiving antenna. The Type 281, including the B-version, was the most battle-tested metric system of the Royal Navy throughout the war.

Air Search/Gunnery Director
In 1938, John F. Coales began the development of 600-MHz (50-cm) equipment. The higher frequency allowed narrower beams (needed for air search) and antennas more suitable for shipboard use. The first 50-cm set was Type 282. With 25-kW output and a pair of Yagi antennas incorporating lobe switching, it was trialed in June 1939. This set detected low-flying aircraft at 2.5 miles and ships at 5 miles. In early 1940, 200 sets were manufactured. To use the Type 282 as a rangefinder for the main armament, an antenna with a large cylindrical parabolic reflector and 12 dipoles was used. This set was designated Type 285 and had a range of 15 miles. Types 282 and Type 285 were used with Bofors 40 mm guns. Type 283 and Type 284 were other 50-cm gunnery director systems.
Type 289 was developed based upon Dutch pre-war radar technology and used a Yagi-antenna. With an improved RDF design it controlled Bofors 40 mm anti-aircraft guns (see Electric listening device).

Microwave Warning/Fire Control
The critical problem of submarine detection required RDF systems operating at higher frequencies than the existing sets because of a submarine's smaller physical size than most other vessels. When the first cavity magnetron was delivered to the TRE, a demonstration breadboard was built and demonstrated to the Admiralty. In early November 1940, a team from Portsmouth under S. E. A. Landale was set up to develop a 10-cm surface-warning set for shipboard use. In December, an experimental apparatus tracked a surfaced submarine at 13 miles range.

At Portsmouth, the team continued development, fitting antennas behind cylindrical parabolas (called "cheese" antennas) to generate a narrow beam that maintained contact as the ship rolled. Designated Type 271 radar, the set was tested in March 1941, detecting the periscope of a submerged submarine at almost a mile. The set was deployed in August 1941, just 12 months after the first apparatus was demonstrated. On November 16, the first German submarine was sunk after being detected by a Type 271.

The initial Type 271 primarily found service on smaller vessels. At ASE Witley, this set was modified to become Type 272 and Type 273 for larger vessels. Using larger reflectors, the Type 273 also effectively detected low-flying aircraft, with a range up to 30 miles. This was the first Royal Navy radar with a plan-position indicator.

Further development led to the Type 277 radar, with almost 100 times the transmitter power. In addition to the microwave detection sets, Coales developed the Type 275 and Type 276 microwave fire-control sets. Magnetron refinements resulted in 3.2-cm (9.4-GHz) devices generating 25-kW peak power. These were used in the Type 262 fire-control radar and Type 268 target-indication and navigation radar.

United States

In 1922, A. Hoyt Taylor and Leo C. Young, then with the U.S. Navy Aircraft Radio Laboratory, noticed that a ship crossing the transmission path of a radio link produced a slow fading in and out of the signal. They reported this as a Doppler-beat interference with potential for detecting the passing of a vessel, but it was not pursued. In 1930, Lawrence A. Hyland. working for Taylor at the Naval Research Laboratory (NRL) noted the same effect from a passing airplane. This was officially reported by Taylor. Hyland, Taylor, and Young were granted a patent (U.S. No. 1981884, 1934) for a "System for detecting objects by radio". It was recognized that detection also needed range measurement, and funding was provided for a pulsed transmitter. This was assigned to a team led by Robert M. Page, and in December 1934, a breadboard apparatus successfully detected an aircraft at a range of one mile.

The Navy, however, ignored further development, and it was not until January 1939, that their first prototype system, the 200-MHz (1.5-m) XAF, was tested at sea. The Navy coined the acronym RAdio Detection And Ranging (RADAR), and in late 1940, ordered this to be exclusively used.

Taylor's 1930 report had been passed on to the U.S. Army's Signal Corps Laboratories (SCL). Here, William R. Blair had projects underway in detecting aircraft from thermal radiation and sound ranging, and started a project in Doppler-beat detection. Following Page's success with pulse-transmission, the SCL soon followed in this area. In 1936, Paul E. Watson developed a pulsed system that on December 14 detected aircraft flying in New York City airspace at ranges up to seven miles. By 1938, this had evolved into the Army's first Radio Position Finding (RPF) set, designated SCR-268, Signal Corps Radio, to disguise the technology. It operated at 200 MHz 1.5 m, with 7-kW peak power. The received signal was used to direct a searchlight.

In Europe, the war with Germany had depleted the United Kingdom of resources. It was decided to give the UK's technical advances to the United States in exchange for access to related American secrets and manufacturing capabilities. In September 1940, the Tizard Mission began.

When the exchange began, the British were surprised to learn of the development of the U.S. Navy's pulse radar system, the CXAM, which was found to be very similar in capability to their Chain Home technology. Although the U.S. had developed pulsed radar independently of the British, there were serious weaknesses in America's efforts, especially the lack of integration of radar into a unified air defense system. Here, the British were without peer.

The result of the Tizard Mission was a major step forward in the evolution of radar in the United States. Although both the NRL and SCL had experimented with 10–cm transmitters, they were stymied by insufficient transmitter power. The cavity magnetron was the answer the U.S. was looking for, and it led to the creation of the MIT Radiation Laboratory (Rad Lab). Before the end of 1940, the Rad Lab was started at MIT, and subsequently almost all radar development in the U.S. was in centimeter-wavelength systems. MIT employed almost 4,000 people at its peak during World War II.

Two other organisations were notable. As the Rad Lab began operations at MIT, a companion group, called the Radio Research Laboratory (RRL), was established at nearby Harvard University. Headed by Frederick Terman, this concentrated on electronic countermeasures to radar. Another organization was the Combined Research Group (CRG) housed at the NRL. This involved American, British, and Canadian teams charged with developing Identification Friend or Foe (IFF) systems used with radars, vital in preventing friendly fire accidents.

Metric-Wavelength
After trials, the original XAF was improved and designated CXAM; these 200-MHz (1.5-m), 15-kW sets went into limited production with first deliveries in May 1940. The CXAM was refined into the SK early-warning radar, with deliveries starting in late 1941. This 200-MHz (1.5-m) system used a "flying bedspring" antenna and had a PPI. With 200-kW peak-power output, it could detect aircraft at ranges up to 100 miles, and ships at 30 miles. The SK remained the standard early-warning radar for large U.S. vessels throughout the war. Derivatives for smaller vessels were SA and SC. About 500 sets of all versions were built. The related SD was a 114-MHz (2.63-m) set designed by the NRL for use on submarines; with a periscope-like antenna mount, it gave early warning but no directional information. The BTL developed a 500-MHz (0.6-m) fire-control radar designated FA (later, Mark 1). A few went into service in mid-1940, but with only 2-kW power, they were soon replaced.

Even before the SCR-268 went into service, Harold Zahl was working at the SCL in developing a better system. The SCR-270 was the mobile version, and the SCR-271 a fixed version. Operating at 106 MHz (2.83 m) with 100 kW pulsed power, these had a range up to 240 miles and began service entry in late 1940. On 7 December 1941 an SCR-270 at Oahu in Hawaii detected the Japanese attack formation at a range of 132 miles (212 km), but this crucial plot was misinterpreted due to a grossly inefficient reporting chain.

One other metric radar was developed by the SCL. After Pearl Harbor, there were concerns that a similar attack might destroy vital locks on the Panama Canal. A transmitter tube that delivered 240-kW pulsed power at 600 MHz (0.5 M) had been developed by Zahl. A team under John W. Marchetti incorporated this in an SCR-268 suitable for picket ships operating up to 100 miles offshore. The equipment was modified to become the AN/TPS-3, a light-weight, portable, early-warning radar used at beachheads and captured airfields in the South Pacific. About 900 were produced.

A British ASV Mk II sample was provided by the Tizard Mission. This became the basis for ASE, for use on patrol aircraft such as the Consolidated PBY Catalina. This was America's first airborne radar to see action; about 7,000 were built. The NRL were working on a 515-MHz (58.3-cm) air-to-surface radar for the Grumman TBF Avenger, a new torpedo bomber. Components of the ASE were incorporated, and it went into production as the ASB when the U.S. entered the war. This set was adopted by the newly formed Army Air Forces as the SCR-521. The last of the non-magnetron radars, over 26,000 were built.

A final "gift" of the Tizard Mission was the Variable Time (VT) Fuze. Alan Butement had conceived the idea for a proximity fuse while he was developing the Coastal Defence system in Great Britain during 1939, and his concept was part of the Tizard Mission. The National Defense Research Committee (NDRC), asked Merle Tuve of the Carnegie Institution of Washington to take the lead in realising the concept, that could increase the probability of kill for shells. From this, the variable-time fuze emerged as an improvement for the fixed-time fuze. The device sensed when the shell neared the target – thus, the name variable-time was applied.

A VT fuze, screwed onto the head of a shell, radiated a CW signal in the 180–220 MHz range. As the shell neared its target, this was reflected at a Doppler shifted frequency by the target and beat with the original signal, the amplitude of which triggered detonation. The device demanded radical miniaturisation of components, and 112 companies and institutions were ultimately involved. In 1942, the project was transferred to the Applied Physics Laboratory, formed by Johns Hopkins University. During the war, some 22 million VT fuses for several calibres of shell were manufactured.

Centimeter

From 1941–1945, many different microwave radar types were developed in America. Most originated in the Rad Lab where some 100 different types were initiated. Although many companies manufactured sets, only Bell Telephone Laboratories (NTL) had major involvement in development. The two primary military research operations, NRL and SCL, had responsibilities in component development, system engineering, testing, and other support, but did not take on roles for developing new centimetric radar systems.

Operating under the Office of Scientific Research and Development, an agency reporting directly to President Franklin Roosevelt, the Rad Lab was directed by Lee Alvin DuBridge with the eminent scientist Isidor Isaac Rabi serving as his deputy. E. G. "Taffy" Bowen, one of the original developers of RDF and a member of the Tizard Mission, remained in the U.S. as an adviser.

The Rad Lab was assigned three initial projects: a 10 cm airborne intercept radar, a 10 cm gun-laying system for anti-aircraft use, and a long-range aircraft navigation system. The cavity magnetron was duplicated by the Bell Telephone Laboratories (BTL) and placed into production for use by the Rad Lab in the first two projects. The third project, based on directional homing technology, ultimately became LORAN. It was conceived by Alfred Lee Loomis, who had helped form the Rad Lab.

Initially, the Rad Lab built an experimental breadboard set with a 10 cm transmitter and receiver using separate antennas (the T-R switch was not yet available). This was successfully tested in February 1941, detecting an aircraft at a range of 4 miles.

The Rad Lab and BTL also improved magnetron performance, enabling the device and associated systems to generate higher wavelengths. As more frequencies were used, it became common to refer to centimeter radar operations in the following bands:

P-Band – 30-100 cm (1-0.3 GHz)
L-Band – 15-30 cm (2-1 GHz)
S-Band – 8-15 cm (4-2 GHz)
C-Band – 4-8 cm (8-4 GHz)
X-Band – 2.5-4 cm (12-8 GHz)
K-Band – Ku: 1.7-2.5 cm (18-12 GHz); Ka: 0.75-1.2 cm (40-27 GHz).
There was a gap in the K-band  to avoid frequencies absorbed by atmospheric water vapor. These ranges are those given by the IEEE Standards; slightly different values are specified in other standards, such as those of the RSGB.

P-Band fire-control
After the BTL developed the FA, the first fire-control radar for the U.S. Navy, it improved this with the FC (for use against surface targets) and FD (for directing anti-aircraft weapons). A few of these 60 cm (750 MHz) sets began service in the fall of 1941. They were later designated Mark 3 and Mark 4, respectively. About 125 Mark 3 and 375 Mark 4 sets were produced.

S-Band airborne
For the Airborne Intercept radar, the Rad Lab 10 cm breadboard set was fitted with a parabolic antenna having azimuth and elevation scanning capabilities. Cathode-ray tube indicators and appropriate controls were also added. Edwin McMillan was primarily responsible for building and testing the engineering set. This was first flight-tested near the end of March 1941, giving target returns at up to five miles distance and without ground clutter, a primary advantage of microwave radar. Designated SCR-520, this was America's first microwave radar. It saw limited service on some larger patrol aircraft, but was too heavy for fighter aircraft. Improved as the much lighter SCR-720, thousands of these sets were manufactured and used extensively by both the U.S. and Great Britain (as the AI Mk X) throughout the war.

S-Band Army Gun-Laying
Microwave gun-laying system development had already started in Great Britain, and it was included with high priority at the Rad Lab due to its urgent need. The project, with Ivan Getting leading, started with the same 10-cm breadboard used in the AI project. Development of the GL system was challenging. A new, complex servomechanism was needed to direct a large parabolic reflector, and automatic tracking was required. On detection of a target, the receiver output would be used to put the servo control into a track-lock mode. The mount and reflector were developed with the Central Engineering Office of Chrysler. BTL developed the electronic analog computer, called the M-9 Predictor-Corrector, containing 160 vacuum tubes. The components were integrated and delivered in May 1942 to the Army Signals Corps for tests. Designated the SCR-584 Anti-Aircraft Gun-Laying System, about 1,500 of these were used in Europe and the Pacific starting in early 1944.

S-Band Navy Search  
After the 10 cm experimental breadboard demonstration, the Navy requested an S-band search radar for shipboard and airborne applications. Under the leadership of Ernest Pollard, the 50 kW SG shipboard set was given sea trials in May 1941, followed by the ASG version for large patrol aircraft and Navy blimps. With a gyro-stabilized mount, the SG could detect large ships at 15 miles and a submarine periscope at 5 miles. About 1,000 of these sets were built. ASG was designated AN/APS-2 and commonly called "George"; some 5,000 of these were built and found to be very effective in submarine detection.

A compact version of the SG for PT boats was designated the SO. These were introduced in 1942. Other variants were the SF, a set for lighter warships, the SH for large merchant vessels, and the SE and SL, for other smaller ships. The Navy also adopted versions of the Army's SCR-584 (without the M-9 unit but with gyro-stabilizers) for shipboard search radars, the SM for fleet carriers and the SP for escort carriers. None of these were produced in large quantities, but were highly useful in operations.

The BTL developed the SJ, an S-Band supplement for the SD meter-wave radar on submarines. The antenna for the SJ could sweep the horizon to about 6 miles with good accuracy. Late in the war, the improved SV increased detection ranges to 30 miles.

L-Band Airborne Early-Warning
The most ambitious, long-term effort of the Rad Lab was Project Cadillac, the first airborne early-warning radar system. Led by Jerome Wiesner, about 20 percent of Rad Lab staff would ultimately be involved. Designated AN/APS-20, this 20 cm (1.5 GHz), 1 MW radar weighed 2,300 pounds including an 8-foot radome enclosing a spinning parabolic antenna. Carried by a TBF Avenger carrier-based aircraft, it could detect large aircraft at ranges up to 100 miles. The airborne radar system included a television camera to pick up the PPI display, and a VHF link transmitted the image back to the Combat Information Center on the host carrier. The system was first flown in August 1944 and went into service the following March. This was the foundation of the post-war Airborne Warning and Control System (AWACS) concept.

X-Band
In 1941, Luis Alvarez invented a phased array antenna having excellent radiation characteristics. When the 3 cm magnetron was developed, the Alvarez antenna was used in a number of X-Band radars. The Eagle, later designated AN/APQ-7, provided a map-like image of the ground some 170 miles along the forward path of a bomber. About 1,600 Eagle sets were built and used by the Army Air Forces primarily over Japan. The same technology was used in the ASD (AN/APS-2 commonly known as "Dog"), a search and homing radar used by the Navy on smaller bombers; this was followed by several lighter versions, including the AIA-1 known as the "radar gunsight".

The Alvarez antenna was also used in developing the Ground Control Approach (GCA), a combined S-Band and X-Band blind-landing system for bomber bases; this system was particularly used in assisting planes returning from missions in poor weather.

The BTL also developed X-Band radars. The Mark 8 (FH) fire-control radar, was based on a new type of antenna developed by George Mueller. This was an end-fired array of 42 pipe-like waveguides that allowed electronic steering of the beam; for this the BTL developed the Mark 4 Fire Control Computer. The Mark 22 was a "nodding" system used for target height-finding with fire-control radars. With an antenna shaped like an orange slice, it gave a very narrow, horizontal beam to search the sky. The Army also adopted this as the AN/TPS-10, a land-version that was commonly called "Li'l Abner" after a popular comic strip character.

Although not implemented into a full system until after the war, the monopulse technique was first demonstrated at the NRL in 1943 on an existing X-Band set. The concept is attributed to Robert Page at the NRL, and was developed to improve the tracking accuracy of radars. Following the war, essentially all new radar systems used this technology, including the AN/FPS-16, the most widely used tracking radar in history.

Soviet Union 

The Soviet Union invaded Poland in September 1939 under the Molotov–Ribbentrop Pact with Germany; the Soviet Union invaded Finland in November 1939; in June 1941, Germany abrogated the non-aggression pact and invaded the Soviet Union. Although the USSR had outstanding scientists and engineers, began research on what would later become radar (radiolokatsiya, lit. radiolocation) as soon as anyone else, and made good progress with early magnetron development, it entered the war without a fielded, fully capable radar system.

Pre-War Radio-Location Research

The USSR military forces were the Raboche-Krest'yanskaya Krasnaya Armiya (RKKA, the Workers' and Peasants' Red Army), the Raboche-Krest'yansky Krasny Flot (RKKF, the Workers' and Peasants' Red Fleet), and the Voyenno-Vozdushnye Sily (VVS, Soviet Air Forces).

By the mid 1930s, Germany's Luftwaffe had aircraft capable of penetrating deep into Soviet territory. Visual observation was used for detecting approaching aircraft. For nighttime detection, the Glavnoye artilleriyskoye upravleniye (GAU, Main Artillery Administration), of the Red Army, had developed an acoustical unit that was used to aim a searchlight at targets. These techniques were impractical with aircraft that were above cloud or at a considerable distance; to overcome this, research was initiated on detection by electromagnetic means. Lieutenant-General M. M. Lobanov was responsible for these efforts in the GAU, and he thoroughly documented this activity later.

Leningrad

Most early work in radioobnaruzhenie (radio-detection) took place in Leningrad, initially at the Leningradskii Elektrofizicheskii Institut, (Leningrad Electro-Physics Institute, LEPI). Here, Abram F. Ioffe, generally considered the leading physicist in the Soviet Union, was the Scientific Director. The LEPI concentrated on radiating continuous wave (CW) signals, detecting the existence and direction of their reflections for use in early warning systems.

While the GAU was interested in detection, the Voiska Protivo-vozdushnoi oborony (PVO, Air Defense Forces) was interested in determining the target range. Pavel K. Oshchepkov on the PVO technical staff in Moscow, strongly believed that the radiolokatory (radio-location) equipment should be pulsed, potentially allowing range to be determined directly. He was transferred to Leningrad to head a Special Construction Bureau (SCB) for radio-location equipment.

To examine current and proposed detection methods, a meeting was called by the Russian Academy of Sciences; this was held at Leningrad on 16 January 1934 and chaired by Ioffe. Radio-location emerged as the most promising technique, but type (CW or pulsed) and wavelength (high frequency or microwave) were left to be resolved

At the SCB, Oshchepkov's team developed an experimental pulsed radio-location system operating at 4 m (75 MHz.). This had a peak power of about 1 kW and a 10-μs pulse duration; separate transmitting and receiving antennas were used. In April 1937, tests achieved a detection range of nearly 17 km at a height of 1.5 km. Although this was a good beginning for pulsed radio-location, the system was not capable of measuring range (the technique of using pulses for determining range was known from probes of the ionosphere but was not pursued). Although he never created a range-finding capability for his system, Oshchepkov is often called the father of radar in the Soviet Union.

As Oshchepkov was exploring pulsed systems, work continued on CW research at the LEPI. In 1935, the LEPI became a part of the Nauchno-issledovatel institut-9 (NII-9, Scientific Research Institute #9), one of several technical sections under the GAU. With M. A. Bonch-Bruevich as Scientific Director, research continued in CW development. Two promising experimental systems were developed. A VHF set designated Bistro (Rapid) and the microwave Burya (Storm). The best features of these were combined into a mobile system called Ulavlivatel Samoletov (Radio Catcher of Aircraft), soon designated RUS-1 (РУС-1). This CW, bi-static system used a truck-mounted transmitter operating at 4.7 m (64 MHz) and two truck-mounted receivers.

In June 1937, all of the work in Leningrad on radio-location stopped. The Great Purge of Joseph Stalin swept over the military and the scientific community, resulting in nearly two million executions. The SCB was closed; Oshchepkov was charged with "high crimes" and sentenced to 10 years at a Gulag. NII-9 was also targeted, but was saved through the influence of Bonch-Bruyevich, a favorite of Vladimir Lenin in the prior decade. NII-9 as an organization was saved, and Bonch-Bruyevich was named director. The purges resulted in a loss of more than a year in development.

RUS-1 was tested and put into production in 1939, entering limited service in 1940, becoming the first deployed radio-location system in the Red Army. Bonch-Bruyevich died in March 1941, creating a leadership gap, further delaying CW radio-location developments.

The Nauchnoissledovatelskii ispytatelnyi institut svyazi RKKA (NIIIS-KA, Scientific Research Institute of Signals of the Red Army), that had originally bitterly opposed radio-location technology, was now placed in overall control of its development in the Soviet Union. They co-opted Oshchepkov's pulsed system, and by July 1938, had a fixed-position, bistatic experimental array that detected an aircraft at 30-km range at heights of 500 m, and at 95-km range for targets at 7.5 km altitude.

The project was then taken on by Ioffe's LPTI, resulting in a system designated Redut (Redoubt) with 50-kW peak-power and a 10-μs pulse-duration. The Redut was first field tested in October 1939, at a site near Sevastopol, a strategic Black Sea naval port .

During 1940, the LEPI took control of Redut development, perfecting the critical capability of range measurements. A cathode-ray display, made from an oscilloscope, was used to show range information. In July 1940, the new system was designated RUS-2 (РУС-2). A transmit-receive device (a duplexer) to allow operating with a common antenna was developed in February 1941. These breakthroughs were achieved at an experimental station at Toksovo (near Leningrad), and an order was placed with the Svetlana Factory for 15 systems.

The final RUS-2 had pulse-power of near 40 kW at 4 m (75 MHz). The set was in a cabin on a motor-driven platform, with a seven-element Yagi-Uda antenna mounted about five meters above the roof. The cabin, with the antenna, could be rotated over a large sector to aim the transmit-receive pattern. Detection range was 10 to 30 km for targets as low as 500 m and 25 to 100 km for high-altitude targets. Variance was about 1.5 km for range and 7 degrees for azimuth.

Kharkov

A second center for radio-location research was in Kharkov, Ukraine. Here the Ukrainian Institute of Physics and Technology (UIPT) closely cooperated with Kharkov University (KU). The UIPT became renowned outside the USSR, and drew visits from world-recognized physicists such as Niels Bohr and Paul Dirac. Future Nobel Laureate Lev Landau led the Theoretical Department. The independent Laboratory of Electromagnetic Oscillations (LEMO) was led by Abram A. Slutskin.

At the LEMO, magnetrons were a major item of research. By 1934, a team led by Aleksandr Y. Usikov had developed a series of segmented-anode magnetrons covering 80 to 20 cm (0.37 to 1.5 GHz), with output power between 30 and 100 W. Semion Y. Braude developed a glass-cased magnetron producing 17 kW with 55 percent efficiency at 80 cm (370 MHz), tunable over a wavelength change of 30 percent, providing frequency coverage of roughly 260 MHz to 480 MHz (the boundary between VHF and UHF). These were described in detail in German-language journals – a practice adopted by the UIPT to gain publicity for their advances.

In 1937, the NIIIS-KA contracted with LEMO for developing a pulsed radio-location system for aircraft detection. The project was code-named Zenit (a popular football team at the time) and was headed by Slutskin. Transmitter development was led by Usikov. The unit used a 60-cm (500-MHz) magnetron pulsed at 7–10-μs duration and providing 3-kW pulsed power, later increased to near 10 kW.

Braude led receiver development. This was a superheterodyne unit initially using a tunable magnetron as the local oscillator, but this lacked stability and was replaced with a circuit using an RCA type 955 acorn triode. The returned pulses were displayed on a cathode-ray oscilloscope, giving range measurement.

Zenit was tested in October 1938. In this, a medium bomber was detected at a range of 3 km, and areas for improvements were determined. After the changes had been made, a demonstration was given in September 1940. It was shown that the three coordinates (range, altitude, and azimuth) of an aircraft flying at heights between 4,000 and 7,000 meters could be determined at up to 25 km distance, but with poor accuracy. Also, with the antennas aimed at a low angle, ground clutter was a problem.

However unsuitable for gun-laying applications, it did show the way for future systems. An operating feature, however, rendered Zenit unsuitable for gun laying for attacking fast-moving aircraft. A null-reading method was used for analyzing the signals; azimuth and elevation coordinates had to be acquired separately, requiring a sequence of antenna movements that took 38 seconds for the three coordinates.

Work at the LEMO continued on Zenit, converting it into a single-antenna system designated Rubin. This effort, however, was disrupted by the invasion of the USSR by Germany in June 1941. In a short while, all of the critical industries and other operations in Kharkov were ordered evacuated far into the East.

Wartime

When the German blitzkrieg swept into the Soviet Union in June 1941, three massive, tank-led Army groups moved in on a  front with Leningrad, Moscow, and the Ukraine region as objectives. There followed what became known to the Soviets as the Great Patriotic War. The Komitet Oborony (Defense Committee – the small group of leaders surrounding Stalin) gave first priority to the defense of Moscow; the laboratories and factories in Leningrad were to be evacuated to the Urals, to be followed by the Kharkov facilities.

Several different radar systems were produced by the Soviet Union in the relocated facilities during the war. supplemented by some 2,600 radar sets of various types under the Lend-Lease Program.

Ground-based

The Sveltana Factory in Leningrad had built about 45 RUS-1 systems. These were deployed along western borders and in the Far East. Without ranging capability, however, the military found the RUS-1 to be of little value.

When air attacks on Leningrad began, the RUS-2 test unit assembled at the Toksovo experimental site was pressed into tactical operation, providing early-warning of Luftwaffe (German Air Force) formations. With a range up to 100 km, this unit gave timely information to civil defence and fighter networks. This gained the attention of authorities, who previously had shown little interest in radio-location equipment.

In mid-July, the radio-location activities of the LEPI and NII-9 were sent to Moscow where they were combined with existing units of the NIIIS-KA. A RUS-2 system was set up near Moscow and manned by recently moved LPTI personnel; it was first used on July 22, when it detected at night an incoming flight of about 200 German bombers while they were 100 km away. This was the first air attack on Moscow, and it immediately led to three rings of anti-aircraft batteries being built around the city, all connected to a central command post.

Several transmitters and receivers built for RUS-2 systems were quickly adapted by the NIII-KA for fixed radio-location stations around Moscow. Designated as RUS-2S and also P2 Pegmatit, these had their Yagi antenna mounted on 20-meter steel towers and could scan a sector of 270 degrees. For building additional equipment, in January 1942, Factory 339 in Moscow became the first manufacturing facility in the Soviet Union devoted to radio-location sets (soon officially called radar). During 1942, this facility built and installed 53 RUS-2S sets around Moscow and other critical locations in the USSR.

Factory 339 had an outstanding research and engineering staff; this had earlier been administratively separated and designated as the Scientific Institute of Radio Industry No. 20 (NII-20). Victor V. Tikhomirov, a pioneer in domestic aircraft radio engineering, was the Technical Director. (Later, the Tikhomirov Scientific Research Institute of Instrument Design was named in his honor.) Factory 339 and the associated NII-20 dominated radar equipment development and fabrication in the USSR throughout the war.

Many sets of a number of different versions of the RUS-2 were built at Factory 339 during the war. While providing early warning, these sets suffered from the deficiency of not providing target height (elevation angle). Thus, they were mainly used in conjunction with visual-observation posts, with humans using optical devices for estimating altitude and identifying the type of aircraft.

From the time of the first efforts in radio-location, the question had been raised as to how the aircraft identification could be made – was it friendly or an enemy? With the introduction of RUS-2, this problem required an immediate solution. The NII-20 developed a unit to be carried on an aircraft that would automatically respond as "friendly" to a radio illumination from a Soviet radar. A transponder, designated as SCH-3 and later called an Identification Friend or Foe (IFF) unit, was placed into production at Factory 339 in 1943. This unit initially responded only to the signal of RUS-2, and only a relatively small number of these and successor units were built in the USSR.

The RUS-2 was sponsored by the PVO and intended for early warning. The GAU still wanted a gun-laying system capable of supporting the anti-aircraft batteries. Upon arriving in Moscow, the radio-location group of the NII-9 continued working for the PVO on this problem, returning to Burya, the experimental microwave set built earlier. Within a few weeks, a team led by Mikhail L. Sliozberg and with the cooperation of NII-20, developed a bi-static CW set designated SON (acronym for Stancyja Orudijnoi Navodki  — Gun Laying Station) using a 15-cm (2.0-GHz) magnetron.

In early October, the experimental Son set was tested in combat by an anti-aircraft battalion near Moscow. The performance of the radio-based Son was poor as compared with that of the existing optics-based Puazo-3, a stereoscopic range-finder that Oshchepkov had earlier improved. The project was discontinued, and no further attempts were made to use magnetrons in radio-location sets. After this failure, NII-9 was sent elsewhere and was no longer involved in radio-location activities. A portion of the radio-location group, including Sliozberg, remained in Moscow working for NII-20.

Shortly after Germany invaded the USSR, a delegation of Soviet military officers visited Great Britain seeking assistance in defense hardware. From their intelligence sources, the Soviets were aware of Britain's gun-laying RDF (Range and Direction Finding) system, the GL Mk II, and asked for this equipment to be tested in the defense of Moscow. In early January 1942, Winston Churchill agreed to send one of these systems to Russia, but with the provision that it would be totally secured under British officers and operated by British technicians.

When the ship carrying the equipment arrived at Murmansk, a seaport off the Bering Sea above the Arctic Circle, there was a winter storm and unloading had to wait overnight. The next morning, it was found that the entire GL Mk II system – mounted on three trucks – had disappeared. The British Embassy made an immediate protest, and after several days the officers were informed that the equipment had been taken to Moscow for security.

It indeed had gone to Moscow – directly to NII-20 and Factory 339, where intelligence experts gave it a total examination and Sliozberg led a team in quickly reverse-engineering the hardware. In mid-February, the NII-20 announced that it had developed a new radio-location system designated Son-2a. It was essentially a direct copy of the GL Mk II.

Operating at 5 m (60 MHz), Son-2a used separate trucks for the transmitting and receiving equipment, and a third truck carried a power generator. In use, a dipole-array transmitting antenna giving a broad pattern was fixed in position atop a grounded pole. Separated from the transmitter by about 100 meters, the receiving station was on a rotatable cabin with wing-like antennas mounted on each side. A mast above the cabin held a pair of antennas that were used with a goniometer for height-finding.

Like the original British GL Mk II, the Son-2a was not of great assistance in directing searchlights and anti-aircraft guns. Nevertheless, it was put into production and released to the Red Army in December 1942. Over the next three years, about 125 of these sets were built. In addition, over 200 GL Mk IIIC systems (improvements over the Mk II and built in Canada) were provided under the Lend-Lease program, making the combination the most-used radar equipment in the Soviet Union during the war.

Ukraine had been the third objective of the invading German Army. By late July 1941, their mechanized forces were approaching this region, and, following orders from the Defense Committee, the UIPT in Kharkov made evacuation preparations. For this, the LEMO was split from the UIPT, and the two organizations would be sent to different cities: Alma-Ata for the main operation and, separated by 1,500 km, Bukhara for the LEMO.

While the preparations for moving were going on, the LEMO was directed to bring the experimental Zeni equipment to Moscow for testing by the NIIIS-KA. In mid-August, Usikov, Braude, and several other LEMO staff members went to Moscow, where they were attached to the NIIIS-KA. The Zenit system was installed in the Moscow outskirts, giving the opportunity for testing in combat. It was found that, while the accuracy of the system was not sufficient for precise aiming, it was satisfactory for barrage firing. It could also be used as a supplement to the RUS-2 surveillance system in guiding fighter aircraft.

In September, the team made field modifications to the Zenit and more tests were run. It was found that the detection range had been doubled, but the dead zone increased by a like amount. The NIIIS-KA believed that the prospects were good for this to be developed into a suitable system, but laboratory conditions were necessary. Thus, the Zenit and all of the NIIIS-KA staff were sent 3,200 km away to Bukhara, joining the remainder of the LEMO as it also moved.

Because of the null-reading method of analyzing the signals, the Zenit system suffered from slowness in measurements (38 seconds for determining the three coordinates) as well as accuracy. It also had a large dead zone caused by ground returns. While still at Kharkov, work had started on Rubin, a system intended to correct Zenit deficiencies. With Slutskin as LEMO Director, this project continued at Bukhara under Usikov's leadership.

A new magnetron was developed; this operated at 54 cm (470 MHz) with a pulse-power increased to 15 kW. A gas-discharge transmit-receive device (a diplexer) was developed for isolating the receiver from the direct transmitter pulse, thus allowing the use of a common transmitting-receiving structure. (A similar development had been made for the RUS-2 common antenna, but this would not have been suitable for the microwave Rubin.)

Several techniques for replacing the null-reading methods were considered, with the final selection making use of a fixture to provide a stationary dipole against which the directional position of the antenna could be continuously determined. Range, azimuth, and elevation were shown on a cathode-ray tube display. There was no provision, however, for feeding this information into an automatic unit for aiming searchlights and guns.

Separate transmitting and receiving dipoles were at the focus of a 3-meter paraboloid reflector. The antenna assembly, with remote controls, could rotate 0–90 degrees vertically and 0–400 degrees horizontally. The width of the main beam was 16 degrees equatorial and 24 degrees meridian.

The system was carried on two trucks, the electronics and control console in one and the power generator in the other. Both the transmitter magnetron and front-end portions of the receiver were in sealed containers attached to the rear of the reflector. The antenna assembly was on rails and could be rolled out to near the truck.

By August 1943, the prototype Rubin system was completed, with all of the work performed by the small LEMO and NIIIS-KA staffs. The system was transported to Moscow where Usikov, Truten, and others conducted further tests and gave non-combat demonstrations. By this time, the British GL Mk II and its Soviet replication, SON-2, were also available and were possibly used in direct comparison with the Rubin; if so, the Rubin would not have fared well.

Rather than releasing the prototype for production, the Army made arrangements for the Rubin to be tried by the Red Fleet Command. At the beginning of 1944, the system was transported to Murmansk, the only non-freezing port in the Soviet Arctic. Here, despite the cold, Usikov continued with tests and demonstrations under better conditions than in the still chaotic Moscow.

Tests aboard a ship showed aircraft detection at 60 km and reliable measurement starting at 40 km. The mean errors were no more than 120-m in range and 0.8-degrees in azimuth and elevation angles. The time for determining the angular coordinates never exceeded 7 seconds, and the dead zone was down to 500 m. Similar accuracies were found for detecting all types of surface vessels, but with the Rubin antenna at deck level, the detection range was understandably much less than that for aircraft.

During the last year of the war, Rubin was used by the Red Fleet for air and surface surveillance in the polar sector. If the GL Mk II and its clone, SON-2ot, had not become available, the Rubin would likely have been completed much earlier and gone into production. Although never put into regular service, this system provided a good foundation for future magnetron-based radars in the Soviet Union.

The cold war brought the threat of intercontinental supersonic bombers. This led to the development of integrated air defense systems such as Uragan-1 where search and acquisition radars at great distance from strategic areas detect inbound threats, integrate that data into an attack or intercept solution, then engage the target with interceptor aircraft or anti-aircraft artillery as the intruder progresses into several layers of weapon systems.

Airborne

A number of new fighter and bomber aircraft were being designed in the years before the war. Vladimir Petlyakov led a Soviet Air Forces (VVS) design bureau, responsible for developing a twin-engine attack-dive bomber that was eventually designated Pe-2. Having fallen behind the schedule, Petlyakov was charged with sabotage and thrown into a technical Gulag; he actually did a large part of his design while incarcerated.

In late 1940, the VVS developed the requirement for an on-board enemy aircraft detection system. The radio-location group at NII-9 in Leningrad was directed to design such a set for the Pe-2. Most of radio-location equipment at that time was large and heavy, and for this aircraft, a small, lightweight set was needed. Also, limitations on antenna size drove the design to frequencies as high as possible. The reflex klystron (as it was later called) had just been developed by Nikolay Devyatkov. Using this, design was started on a set designated Gneis (Origin) and operating at 16 cm (1.8 GHz).

When the NII-9 was evacuated to Moscow in July 1941, this greatly affected the schedule. Also, the reflex klystron had not been put into production and its availability in the future was doubtful; therefore, the project was terminated. The need, however, for an airborne radio-location set was now even more important; the Pe-3, a heavy fighter variant of the Pe-2, was in production. Some of these aircraft were being configured as night-fighters, and the radar (as it was now called) was urgently needed. The NII-20 and Factory 339 took up the design, led by the Technical Director, Victor Tikhomirov.

The new set, designated Gneiss-2 (Гнейс-2), operated at 1.5 m (200 MHz). The Pe-3 fighter was a two-place aircraft, with the pilot and the rear gunner/radio operator seated back to back. The radar was designed as another piece of equipment for the radio operator.

The antennas were mounted above the top surface of the wings, a broad-pattern transmitting array on one wing and two Yagi receiving antennas on the other. One Yagi was directed forward and the other, a few feet away, aimed outward 45 degrees. The fuselage of the aircraft provided a shield between the transmitting and receiving antennas. The system had a range of about 4 km and could give the target's azimuth relative to the fighter's flight path.

The Gneis-2, the first aircraft radar in the Soviet Union, was proven in combat at Stalingrad during December 1942. About 230 of these sets were built during the war. A few were installed on Yak-9 and (out of number sequence) Yak-3 aircraft, the advanced fighters that eventually gave the VVS parity with the Luftwaffe. Other sets with Gneis designations were developed at Plant 339 for experimental purposes, particularly with Lavochkin La-5 fighters and Ilyushin Il-2 ground-assault aircraft, but none of these sets were placed into production.

Naval

During the 1930s, the RKKF (Red Fleet) had major programs in developing radio communications. Starting in 1932, this activity was headed by Aksel Ivanovich Berg Director of the NIIIS-KF, Red Fleet Signals Research) and later given the rank of Engineer-Admiral. He was also a professor at Leningrad's universities and closely followed the early radio-location progress at the LPTI and NII-9. He started a research program in this technology at the NIIIS-KF, but was interrupted by being arrested in 1937 during the Great Purge and spent three years in prison.

Berg was released in early 1940 and reinstated in his positions. After reviewing the tests of Redut conducted at Sevastopol, he obtained a RUS-2 cabin and had it adapted for shipboard testing. Designated Redut-K, it was placed on the light cruiser Molotov in April 1941, making this the first warship in the RKKF with a radio-location capability. After the start of the war, only a few of these sets were built.

In mid-1943, radar (radiolokatsiya) was finally recognized as a vital Soviet activity. A Council for Radar, attached to the State Defense Committee, was established; Berg was made Deputy Minister, responsible for all radar in the USSR. While involved with all future developments in this activity, he took special interest in Navy systems. Berg was later mainly responsible for introducing cybernetics in the Soviet Union.

Other indigenous Soviet Navy radars developed (but not put into production) during the war included Gyuis-1, operating at 1.4 m with 80- kW pulse power. This was a successor to Redut-K for early warning; the prototype was installed on the destroyer Gromkii in 1944. Two fire-control radars were simultaneously developed: Mars-1 for cruisers and Mars-2 for destroyers. Both were tested just at the close of the war, and later placed into production as Redan-1 and Redan-2, respectively.

Germany

Germany has a long heritage of using electromagnetic waves for detecting objects. In 1888, Heinrich Hertz, who first demonstrated the existence of these waves, also noted that they, like light, were reflected by metal surfaces. In 1904, Christian Hülsmeyer obtained German and foreign patents for an apparatus, the Telemobilskop, using a spark gap transmitter that could detect ships and prevent collisions; this is often cited as the first radar, but, without directly providing range, it does not qualify for this classification. With the advent of the radio tube and electronics, other detection-only systems were developed, but all used continuous waves and could not measure distance.

In 1933, physicist Rudolf Kühnhold, Scientific Director at the Kriegsmarine (German Navy) Nachrichtenmittel-Versuchsanstalt (NVA) (Signals Research Establishment) in Kiel, initiated experiments in the microwave region to measure the distance to a target. For the transmitter, he obtained assistance from two radio amateur operators, Paul-Günther Erbslöh and Hans-Karl Freiherr von Willisen. In January 1934, they formed at Berlin-Oberschöneweide the company Gesellschaft für Elektroakustische und Mechanische Apparate (GEMA) for this work.

Development of a Funkmessgerät für Untersuchung (radio measuring device for reconnaissance) soon began in earnest at GEMA. Hans Hollmann and Theodor Schultes, both affiliated with the prestigious Heinrich Hertz Institute in Berlin, were added as consultants. The first development was a continuous-wave apparatus using Doppler-beat interference for detection. Kühnhold then shifted the GEMA work to a pulse-modulated system.

Using a 50 cm (600 MHz) magnetron from Philips, their first transmitter was modulated with 2-μs pulses at a pulse repetition frequency (PRF) of 2000 Hz. The transmitting antenna was an array of 10 pairs of dipoles with a reflecting mesh, and the receiving antenna had three pairs of dipoles and incorporated lobe switching. The wide-band regenerative receiver used an RCA 955 acorn triode. A blocking device (a duplexer), shut the receiver input when the transmitter pulsed. A Braun tube was used for displaying the range. It was first tested during May 1935 at the NVA site (from 1939 on: Nachrichten-Versuchskommando(NVK) (signals research command)) Pelzerhaken at the Bay of Lübeck near Neustadt in Holstein, detecting returns from woods across the bay at a range of 15 km (9.3 mi). In Germany, Kühnhold is often called the "Father of radar".

This first Funkmessgerät from GEMA incorporated more advanced technologies than early sets in Great Britain and the United States, but it appears radar received a much lower priority until later in World War II; by the start of the war, few had been fielded. To a large part, this was due to the lack of appreciation of this technology by the military hierarchy, especially at the top where dictator Adolf Hitler looked on radar as a defensive weapon, and his interest was in offensive hardware. This problem was compounded by the lackadaisical approach to command staffing. It was some time before the Luftwaffe had a command and control system nearly as effective as the one set up by the Royal Air Force in Great Britain before the war.

Wolfgang Martini, a career Luftwaffe officer, was the primary promoter of radar to the German High Command. Although not university educated, his grasp of this technology was instinctive and his involvement was perhaps the greatest impetus to the ultimate development of wartime radar in Germany. In 1941, he was elevated to General der Luftnachrichtentruppe (General of the Air Signal Corps) and remained in this position until the end of the war in May 1945.

All three branches of the combined Wehrmacht armed forces of Nazi Germany: the Luftwaffe (Air Force), the Kriegsmarine (Navy), and the Heer (Army); used German radar technology and hardware. Although a number of development laboratories were operated by these users, the vast majority of radars were supplied by four commercial firms: GEMA, Telefunken, Lorenz, and Siemens & Halske. Near the end of the war in 1945, GEMA led the German radar work, growing to over 6,000 employees.

The official designation of radar systems was FuMG (Funkmessgerät, literally "Radio measuring device"), with most also with a letter (e.g., G, T, L, or S) indicating the manufacturer, as well as a number showing the year of release and possibly a letter or number giving the model. There was, however, a lack of uniformity in designations.

Ground and ship-based

In early 1938, the Kriegsmarine funded GEMA for the development of two systems, one a gun-laying set and the other an air-warning set. In production, the first type became the 80-cm (380-MHz) Flakleit, capable of directing fire on surface or air targets within an 80-km range. It had an antenna configuration very similar to the U.S. SCR-268. The fixed-position version, the Flakleit-G, included a height-finder.

The second type developed by GEMA was the 2.5 m (120 MHz) Seetakt. Throughout the war, GEMA provided a wide variety of Seetakt sets, mainly for ships but also for several types for U-boats. Most had an excellent range-measuring module called Messkette (measuring chain) that provided range accuracy within a few meters regardless of the total range. The shipboard Seetakt used a "mattress" antenna similar to the "bedspring" on the American CXAM.

Although the Kriegsmarine attempted to keep the GEMA from working with the other services, the Luftwaffe became aware of the Seetakt and ordered their own version in late 1938. Called the Freya, this was a ground-based radar operating around 2.4 m (125 MHz) with 15-kW peak power giving a range of some 130 km. The basic Freya radar was continuously improved, with over 1,000 systems eventually built.

In 1940, Josef Kammhuber used Freyas in a new air-defense network extending through the Netherlands, Belgium, and France. Called the Kammhuber Line by the Allies, it was composed of a series of cells code-named Himmelbett (four-poster bed), each covering an area some 45 km wide and 30 km deep, and containing a radar, several searchlights, and a primary and backup night-fighter aircraft. This was relatively effective except when the sky was overcast. A new gun-directing radar was needed to cover this deficiency and the Luftwaffe then contracted with Telefunken for such a system.

Under the leadership of Wilhelm Runge, the new radar was built by Telefunken around a new triode capable of delivering 10-kW pulse power at 60 cm (500 MHz). Code-named Würzburg (the leading engineer Runge prefers code-names of German cities like Würzburg), this had a 3-m (10-ft) parabolic reflector supplied by the Zeppelin Company and was effective at a range of about 40 km for aircraft. Two of these radars were normally added to each Himmelbett, one to pick up the target from a Freya and a second to track the fighter aircraft. Requiring only one operator, the Würzburg came to be the primary mobile, gun-laying system used by the Luftwaffe and Heer during the war. About 4,000 of the various versions of the basic system were eventually produced.

The Air Defense System was continually upgraded. To improve the range and accuracy, Telefunken developed the Würzburg-Riese and GEMA enlarged the Freya dipoles to make the Mammut and the Wassermann. The Würzburg-Riese (Giant Würzburg) had a 7.5-m (25-foot) dish (another product from Zeppelin) that was mounted on a railway carriage. The system also had an increased transmitter power; combined with the enlarged reflector, this resulted in a range of up to 70 km, as well as greatly increased accuracy. About 1,500 of this radar system were built.

The Mammut (mammoth) used 16 Freyas linked into a giant 30- by 10-meter (100- by 33-foot) antenna with phased array beam-directing, a technique that would eventually become standard in radars. It had a range up to 300 km and covered some 100 degrees in width with an accuracy of near 0.5 degree. About 30 sets were built, some with back-to-back faces for bi-directional coverage. The Wassermann (waterman), had eight Freyas also with phased-array antennas, stacked on a steerable, 56-meter (190-foot) tower and giving a range up to 240 km. A variant, Wassermann-S, had the radars mounted on a tall cylinder. About 150 of all types were built starting in 1942.

A system with great range was needed to track the British and American bomber formations as they crossed Germany. For this function, consultants Theodor Schultes and Hans Hollmann designed an experimental 2.4-m (125-MHz), 30-kW radar called Panorama. Built by Siemens & Halske in 1941, it was placed atop a concrete tower at Tremmen, a few kilometers south of Berlin. The antenna had 18 dipoles on a long, horizontal support and produced a narrow vertical beam; this rotated at 6 rpm to sweep out 360-degrees of coverage to about 110 km.

Based on the operation of Panorama, Siemens & Halske improved this system, and renamed it Jagdschloss (hunting lodge). They added a second switchable operation to 150 kW at 1.2 m (250 MHz), increasing the range to near 200 km. The information from the receivers was sent via co-axial cable or a 50-cm link from the tower to a central command center, where it was used to direct fighter aircraft. Hollmann's polar-coordinate (PPI) CRT was used in the display, the first German system with this device; it was also added to the Panorama. The Jagdschloss entered service in late 1943, and about 80 systems were eventually built. The Jagdwagen (hunting car) was a mobile, single-frequency version; operating at 54 cm (560 MHz), it had a correspondingly smaller antenna system.

Under an internally funded project, the firm Lorenz AG developed a pulse-modulated set. The Heer contracted for a few sets for Flak (anti-aircraft) support, but then this mission was transferred to the Luftwaffe. Over several years, Lorenz was unsuccessful in selling new versions called Kurfürst and Kurmark (both Holy Roman Imperial terms). As the war continued, a need was seen by the Luftwaffe for additional radars. Lorenz again modified their sets to become the Tiefentwiel, a transportable system built to complement the Freya against low-flying aircraft, and the Jagdwagen, a mobile unit used for air surveillance. These 54-cm (560-MHz) units with plan-position indicators, had two antennas backed by parabolic, mesh reflectors on rotatable, forked frames that lifted above the equipment cabin. Starting in 1944, both of these systems were produced by Lorenz for the Luftwaffe in relatively small numbers.

Although German researchers had developed magnetrons in the early 1930s (Hans Hollmann received a U.S. patent on his device in July 1938), none had been suitable for military radars. In February 1943, a British bomber containing a H2S radar was shot down over the Netherlands, and the 10-cm magnetron was found intact. In short order, the secret of making successful magnetrons was discovered, and microwave radar development started.

Telefunken was commissioned to build a gun-laying set for Flak applications, and at the beginning of 1944, a 10-cm set code-named Marbach emerged. Using a 3-m Mannheim reflector, this set had a detection range of about 30 km. Its most important characteristic was a relative immunity to Window – the chaff used by the British as a countermeasure against the 50-cm Würzburg. The Marbach was produced in limited quantities for Flak batteries around a number of large industrial cities.

Several other 10-cm sets were developed, but none made it into mass production. One was Jagdschloss Z, a Panorama-type experimental set with 100-kW pulse-power built by Siemens & Halske. Klumbach was a similar set but with only 15-kW pulse-power and using a cylindrical parabolic reflector to produce a very narrow beam; when used with Marbach, the combined fire-control system was called Egerland.

Near the end of 1943, the Germans also salvaged radars containing 3-cm magnetrons, but sets operating at this wavelength were never produced. They did, however, play an important role in the German development of countermeasures, particularly radar warning receivers.

Airborne

In June 1941 an RAF bomber equipped with an ASV (Air-to-Surface Vessel) Mk II radar made an emergency landing in France. Although the crew had attempted to destroy the set, the remains were sufficient for the German Laboratory for Aviation to discern the operation and its function. Tests indicated the merits of such a radar, and Wolfgang Martini also saw the value and tasked Lorenz to develop a similar system.

With backgrounds in aircraft navigation equipment and experience in developing their internally funded ground-radar systems, Lorenz had excellent capabilities for this project. Before the end of the year, they had built a set based on their Kurfürst/Kurmark design, but greatly reduced in size and weight, and with improved electronics. Designated FuG 200 Hohentwiel, it produced 50-kW pulse-power at low-UHF band frequencies (545 MHz) and had a very low PRF of 50 Hz. The set used two separate antenna arrangements, providing searching either forward or side-looking.

The Hohentwiel demonstration detected a large ship at 80 km, a surfaced submarine at 40 km, a submarine periscope at 6 km, aircraft at 10 to 20 km, and land features at 120 to 150 km. A bearing accuracy of about 1 degree was obtained by rapidly switching between two receiver antennas aimed 30 degrees on each side of the transmitter antenna direction. Put into production in 1942, the Hohentwiel was highly successful. It was first used on large reconnaissance aircraft such as the Fw 200 Condor. In 1943, the Hohentwiel-U, an adaptation for use on submarines, provided a range of 7 km for surface vessels and 20 km for aircraft. Altogether, some 150 sets per month were delivered.

The use of the accurate Freya and Würzburg radars in their air-defense systems allowed the Germans to have a somewhat less vigorous approach to the development of airborne radar. Unlike the British, whose inaccurate CH systems demanded some sort of system in the aircraft, the Würzburg was accurate enough to allow them to leave the radar on the ground. This came back to haunt them when the British discovered the mode of operation of the Himmelbett tactic, and the development of an airborne system became much more important.

In early 1941, Air Defense recognized the need for radar on their night-fighter aircraft. The requirements were given to Runge at Telefunken, and by the summer a prototype system was tested. Code-named Lichtenstein, this was originally a low-UHF band, (485-MHz), 1.5-kW system in its earliest B/C model, generally based on the technology now well established by Telefunken for the Würzburg. The design problems were reduction in weight, provision of a good minimum range (very important for air-to-air combat), and an appropriate antenna design. An excellent minimum range of 200 m was achieved by carefully shaping the pulse. The Matratze (mattress) antenna array in its full form had sixteen dipoles with reflectors (a total of 32 elements), giving a wide searching field and a typical 4-km maximum range (limited by ground clutter and dependent on altitude), but producing a great deal of aerodynamic drag. A rotating phase-shifter was inserted in the transmission lines to produce a twirling beam. The elevation and azimuth of a target relative to the fighter were shown by corresponding positions on a triple-tube CRT display.

The first production sets (Lichtenstein B/C) became available in February 1942, but were not accepted into combat until September. The Nachtjäger (night fighter) pilots found to their dismay, that the 32-element Matratze array was slowing their aircraft up by as much as 50 km/h. In May 1943, a B/C-equipped Ju 88R-1 night fighter aircraft landed in Scotland, which still survives as a restored museum piece; it had been flown into Scotland by a trio of defecting Luftwaffe pilots. The British immediately recognized that they already had an excellent countermeasure in Window (the chaff used against the Würzburg); in a short time the B/C was greatly reduced in usefulness.

When the chaff problem was realized by Germany, it was decided to make the wavelength variable, allowing the operator to tune away from chaff returns. In mid-1943, the greatly improved Lichtenstein SN-2 was released, operating with a VHF band wavelength changeable between 3.7 and 4.1 m (81 to 73 MHz). The British took longer to find jamming for the SN-2, but this was eventually accomplished after July 1944. The much longer set of eight dipole elements for the full Hirschgeweih (stag's antlers) antenna array replaced the set of thirty-two elements of the Matratze array from the UHF-band B/C and C-1 sets, but with the early SN-2 sets having a deficient minimum range of about half a kilometer, aircraft often needed to retain the earlier gear to make up for this until the deficiency was addressed. This sometimes resulted in full sets of both Matratze and Hirschgeweih antennas festooning the noses of German night fighters, causing a disastrous problem with drag until a "one-quarter" subset of the Matratze array was created for a centrally mounted installation on the nose, replacing the full four-set UHF array. Then, as the minimum range problem was worked out with the SN-2 sets later in 1943, the earlier UHF-band B/C and C-1 sets and their antennas could be removed entirely. As the planned replacement for the Lichtenstein series of sets, the government-developed Neptun radar, operating on yet a third set of different mid-VHF band frequencies (from 125 MHz to 187 MHz) to avoid Window interference, was placed in production by early 1944, and could use the same Hirschgweih antennas—with shorter dipoles fitted—as the SN-2 sets had used. By the 1943-44 timeframe, the SN-2 and Neptun radars could also use the experimental Morgenstern German AI VHF-band radar antenna, using twin 90°-angled three-dipole pairs of Yagi antennas mounted to a single forward-projecting mast, making it possible to fair the array for drag reduction purposes within a conical, rubber-covered plywood radome on an aircraft's nose, with the extreme tips of the Morgenstern's antenna elements protruding from the radome's surface. At least one Ju 88G-6 night fighter of the NJG 4 night fighter wing's staff flight used it late in the war for its Lichtenstein SN-2 AI radar installation.

Although Telefunken had not been previously involved with radars of any type for fighter aircraft, in 1944 they started the conversion of a Marbach 10-cm set for this application. Downed American and British planes were scavenged for radar components; of special interest were the swiveling mechanisms used to scan the beam over the search area. An airborne set with a half-elliptical radome enclosed dish antenna, code-named FuG 240 Berlin was completed in January 1945, and about 40 sets were built and placed on night-fighter aircraft. A few sets, code named Berlin-S, were also built for shipboard surveillance.

Japan

In the years prior to World War II, Japan had knowledgeable researchers in the technologies necessary for radar; they were especially advanced in magnetron development. However, a lack of appreciation of radar's potential and rivalry between army, navy and civilian research groups meant Japan's development was slow. It was not until November 1941, just days before the attack on Pearl Harbor, that Japan placed into service its first full radar system. In August 1942, U.S. marines captured one of these first systems, and, although crude even by the standards of early U.S. radars, the fact the Japanese had any radar capability came as a surprise. Japanese radar technology was 3 to 5 years behind that of America, Great Britain, and Germany throughout the war.

A major leader in early technology development was Hidetsugu Yagi, a professor and researcher of international status. His papers in the late 1920s on antennas and magnetron design were closely studied by scientists and engineers worldwide. He was allowed no part, however, in developing Japan's wartime radars. His earlier work was given so little attention by the Japanese military that, when they received a captured British radar set, at first they were unaware that the "Yagi" mentioned in accompanying notes referred to a Japanese invention.

Although Japan had joined Nazi Germany and Fascist Italy in a Tripartite Pact in 1936, there had been essentially no exchange of technical information. This changed in December 1940 when a group of Japanese officers representing Army technology was allowed to visit Germany, followed in January by a similar group from the Navy. In the visit, the Japanese were shown some German radars and a British MRU (their earliest searchlight-control radar), left behind during the Dunkirk evacuation. In addition, German-educated Yoji Ito, leader of the Navy delegation, was able to obtain information from the host on the MRU's pulsed operation. Ito immediately sent this information home by diplomatic courier, and work was started by the Navy on Japan's first true radar.

After war was started with the United States in December 1941, the Germans shipped a Würzburg radar to Japan. The submarine carrying this equipment was sunk on the way, and a second set met the same fate; however, some key hardware and documentation, sent on a separate vessel, made it safely.

When Singapore was taken by Japan in February 1942, the remains of what turned out to be a British GL Mk-2 radar and a Searchlight Control (SLC) radar were found. Along with the hardware, there was a set of hand-written notes, giving details of the theory and operation of the SLC. At Corregidor the following May, the captors found two U.S. Army radars, an SCR-268 in operating condition and a heavily damaged SCR-270. In a rare cooperative effort, the Army and Navy jointly conducted reverse engineering on these sets.

About 7,250 radar sets of 30 different types were developed for the Army and Navy.

Imperial Army

The Tama Technology Research Institute (TTRI) was formed by the Army to lead in what was called Radio Range-Finder (RRF) development. TTRI was staffed with competent personnel, but most of their developmental work was done by contractors at the research laboratories of Toshiba Shibaura Denki (Toshiba) and Nippon Electric Company (NEC).

The TTRI established a system for designating the Army radar equipment, based on its use. The prefixes were Ta-Chi (written herein as Tachi) for land-based systems, Ta-Se for shipborne systems, and Ta-Ki for airborne systems. The "Ta" denoted Tama, the "Chi" was from tsuchi (earth), the "Se" means mizu (water) rapids, and "Ki" was from kuki (air).

In June 1942, both NEC and Toshiba started projects based on the SCR-268. The American system operated at 1.5 m (200 MHz). It had a very complex set of three antennas on a horizontal, rotatable boom and used lobe switching. The NEC project was for a target-tracking system designated Tachi-1, essentially a copy of the SCR-268. The duplication of this system was found to be too difficult, and Tachi-1 was soon abandoned. At Toshiba, the project was also for a target-tracking system designated Tachi-2. This was to incorporate many simplifications to the SCR-268. Preliminary tests showed that it would be too fragile for field operation; this project was also abandoned.

The British GL Mk 2 was much less complicated than the SCR-268 and was easily reverse engineered; in addition, the notes on the SLC were available. From this came the Tachi-3, a ground-based tracking radar. This included many significant changes to the original British system; foremost were a change to a fixed-location configuration and a totally different antenna system.

The Tachi-3 transmitter operated at 3.75 m (80 MHz), and produced about 50-kW peak power, with 1- to 2-ms pulse width and 1- or 2-kHz PRF. The transmitter was designed for enclosure in an underground shelter. It used a Yagi antenna that was rigidly mounted above the shelter and the entire unit could be rotated in azimuth. By phasing the antenna elements, some elevation change could be attained.

The receiver for Tachi-3 was located in another underground shelter about 30-m distance from the transmitter. Four dipole antennas were mounted on orthogonal arms, and the shelter and antennas rotated to scan in azimuth. The maximum range was about 40 km. NEC built some 150 of these sets, and they finally entered service in early 1944.

The follow-on project at Toshiba was designated Tachi-4. This was for a ground-based tracking radar, again using the SCR-268 as a pattern. Still with the original 1.5 m (200 MHz) operation, this set performed reasonably well, and about 70 sets were produced. These began service in mid-1944; however, by then the Tachi-3 was available and was superior in performance.

Engineers at Toshiba had already begun work on a pulse-modulated system. With the arrival of the damaged SCR-270, portions were incorporated into the ongoing development of a fixed-site, early-warning system designated Tachi-6. The transmitter operated in the 3- to 4-m (100- to 75-MHz) band with a peak power of 50 kW. It used a dipole-array antenna atop a tall pole. Multiple receiver stations were spaced about 100 m around the transmitter. Each of these had a hand-rotated pole with Yagi antennas at two levels, allowing azimuth and elevation measurements. One receiver station could track an aircraft while the others were searching. Ranges up to 300 km were attained and shown on a CRT display. This went into service in early 1943; about 350 Tachi-6 systems were eventually built.

A transportable version of this early-warning system was added. Designated Tachi-7, the primary difference was that the transmitter with a folding antenna was on a pallet. About 60 of these were built. This was followed in 1944 with the Tachi-18, a much lighter, further simplified version that could be carried with troops. Several hundred of these "portable" sets were built, and a number were found as the Japanese vacated distant occupied territory. All of these continued to operate in the 3- to 4-m band.

Other land-based radars developed by the Imperial Army included two height-finder sets, Tachi-20 and Tachi-35, but they were too late to be put into service. There was also Tachi-28, a radar-based aircraft guidance set. The TTRI also developed the Tachi-24, their slightly modified version of the German Würzburg radar, but this was never put into production.

The Imperial Army had its own ships, ranging in size from attack motorboats to large landing crafts. For these, they developed Tase-1 and Tase-2, both anti-surface radars. The Imperial Army also had its own Air Divisions with fighters, bombers, transports, and reconnaissance aircraft. Only two systems were developed for these aircraft: Taki-1, an airborne surveillance radar in three models, and Taki-11, an airborne electronic countermeasures (ECM) set.

Imperial Navy

The Naval Technical Research Institute (NTRI) began work on a pulse-modulated system in August 1941, even before Yoji Ito returned from Germany. With assistance from NEC (Nippon Electric Company) and the Research Laboratory of NHK (Japan Broadcasting Corporation), a prototype set was developed on a crash basis. Kenjiro Takayanagi, Chief Engineer of NHK, developed the pulse-forming and timing circuits as well as the receiver display. The prototype was tested in early September.

The system, Japan's first full radar, was designated Mark 1 Model 1. (This type of designation is shortened herein to the numbers only; e.g., Type 11.) The system operated at 3.0 m (100 MHz) with a peak-power of 40 kW. Dipole arrays with mat-type reflectors were used in separate antennas for transmitting and receiving. In November 1941, the first manufactured Type 11 was placed into service as a land-based early-warning radar on the Pacific coast. Some 30 sets were built and used throughout the war.

Type 12, another land-based early-warning system, followed during 1942. It was similar to its predecessor but lighter in weight (about ) and on a movable platform. Three versions were made; they operated at either 2.0 m (150 MHz) or 1.5 m (200 MHz), each with a peak-power of only 5 kW. The lower power significantly reduced the range. About 50 sets of all versions of these systems were built.

Another similar system was the Type 21. About 40 sets were eventually built.

In this same time period, the more use-flexible Type 13 was also being designed. Operating at 2.0 m (150 MHz) and with a peak power of 10 kW, this set included a major advancement. A unit duplexer had been developed to allow the use of a common antenna. Its detection range was about the same as the Type 12. It was placed into service in late 1942, and by 1944 it had also been adapted for use on surfaced submarines. With some 1,000 sets eventually being built, the Type 13 was by far the most used air- and surface-search radar of the Imperial Navy.

The Type 14 was a shipboard system designed for long-range, air-search applications. Only two of these systems were placed in service in May 1945, just at the end of the war.

The Imperial Navy built two radars based on the captured SCR-268. The Type 41 was electronically like the original, but with two large dipole array antennas and configured for shipboard, fire-control applications. About 50 of these were built, and it went into service in August 1943. The Type 42 had more revisions, including a change to using four Yagi antennas. Some 60 were built and put into service in October 1944. Both systems had a range of about 40 km.

The NTRI made minimal changes to the 60 cm (500-MHz) Würzburg, mainly converting the oscillator from vacuum tubes to a magnetron. The result was the Type 23 anti-ship, fire-control radar intended for cruisers and larger ships. With the change to a magnetron, the output was approximately halved to a peak-power of about 5 kW; this gave a range of only  for detecting most surface ships. Although the prototype was completed in March 1944, only a few sets were built, and it was never put into serial production.

Japan Radio Company (JRC) had long worked with the NTRI in developing magnetrons. In early 1941, JRC was given a contract by NTRI to design and build a microwave surface-detection system for warships. Designated Type 22, this used a pulse-modulated, 10 cm (3.0 GHz) magnetron with water-cooling and producing 2 kW peak-power. The receiver was a super-heterodyne type with a low-power magnetron serving as the local oscillator. Separate horn antennas were used for transmitting and receiving. These were mounted on a common platform that could be rotated in the horizontal plane. Since it was Japan's first full set using a magnetron, Yoji Ito was made responsible and gave it special attention.

The first Japanese warships with microwave radar received these in March 1942, and by late 1944, microwave radar was widely in use on surface vessels and submarines; about 300 Type 22 sets were built.

With the poor range of the Type 23 (the Würzburg copy), development was started on three microwave systems for fire-control applications. The Type 31 operated at 10 cm (3 GHz) and, like the Würzburg, used a common parabolic reflector. While the prototype could detect larger ships at up to 35 km, it was not completed until March 1945 and was never placed into production.

The Type 32 was another 10 cm system, this one having separate square-horn antennas. Detection range for large ships was about 30 km. It became operational in September 1944, and some 60 sets were produced. Type 33 was still another 10 cm set; this one used separate round-horn antennas. The prototype was completed in August 1944, but like the Type 23, detection range was only 13 km and it was not put into production.

The Imperial Navy had a large number of aircraft. It was almost a year after the start of the war, however, before the first airborne set was developed at the Oppama Naval Air Technical Depot (ONATD). Initially designated Type H-6, with a number of experimental sets built, this was eventually produced as the Type 64 and began service in August 1942. The greatest developmental problem was in bringing the weight down to that allowable for an aircraft;  was eventually achieved.

Intended for both air and surface search, the Type 64 operated at 2 m (150 MHz) with a peak power of 3 to 5 kW and a pulse width of 10 ms. This set was initially used on H8K-class four-engine flying boats, then later on a variety of mid-sized attack planes and torpedo bombers. It was by far the most used airborne radar, with about 2,000 sets produced.

Development continued on lighter-weight systems at the ONATD. The Type N-6 weighing  was available in October 1944, but only 20 sets were built. This was a 1.2 m (250-MHz), 2 kW experimental set intended for a single-engine, three-place (pilot, gunner, and radar operator) fighter aircraft. Specifically designed for the Kyūshū Q1W Tokai, a new two-engine three-place anti-submarine aircraft, about 100 sets were built, going into service in January 1945.

With assistance from the NTRI and Yoji Ito, the ONATD also developed Japan's only airborne microwave radar. Designated FD-2 (sometimes FD-3), this was a magnetron-based, 25 cm (1.2-GHz), 2 kW set weighing about 70 kg. It used four Yagi antennas mounted in the nose area; separate elements for transmit and receive were skewed for searching. Unlike in the air warfare in Europe, there were few night-fighter aircraft used by Japan; consequently, it was mid-1944 before the Type FD-2 was put into use. Some 100 sets were manufactured.

When magnetrons were being developed in Japan, the initial primary application was intended to be power transmission, not radar. As these devices increased in output energy, their application for a weapon became apparent. For research in special weapons, a large facility was built in Shimada. In 1943, a project in developing a Ku-go (Death Ray) using magnetrons began. By the end of the war, magnetrons developing 100 kW continuous power at 75 cm (400 MHz) had been built, and the intent was apparently to couple 10 of these to produce a beam of 1,000 kW. Essentially all of the equipment and documents at Shimada were destroyed before the Americans reached the facility.

Italy

The first radar prototypes in Italy were developed as early as 1935 by electronics researcher Ugo Tiberio who, after graduating in 1927 from the Royal School of Engineering in Naples, published some papers on electromagnetism and, during his military service, was posted to the Military Communications Institute in Rome where Colonel Luigi Sacco - after having observed some experiments made by Guglielmo Marconi on the reflection of radio waves - gave him the task to verify whether these properties of radio waves could be used to find the location of distant objects.

After his discharge from the Royal Army, Tiberio's work came to the attention of Nello Carrara, a professor at the Italian Naval Academy of Livorno, who obtained for him a commission as Lieutenant in order to allow him to further his research at the Academy. This led to the development in the period 1936–1937 of the first functioning prototype of a naval radar, the EC-1 nicknamed "Gufo" (owl).

Notwithstanding their achievement, conducted under the supervision of Navy Captain Alfeo Brandimarte, the project was stalled due to the lack of funding and resources, as both Tiberi and Carrara had to attend their teaching duties and could only do research in their spare time. Furthermore, notwithstanding the efforts of Capt. Brandimarte in bringing the importance of the device to the Italian Royal Navy's higher echelons, his perorations were met with arrogance and disbelief. One admiral went so far to tell him that: "In the whole history of naval warfare, battles have taken place during daytime, therefore the fact that your device could locate enemy ships in nighttime is completely useless!".

This attitude lasted until 1941, when interest in the radar was abruptly revived soon after the Italian navy suffered a series of heavy setbacks in night actions against the radar-equipped units of the Royal Navy, especially that of the Battle of Cape Matapan where over 3,000 sailors and officers were lost at sea without managing to fire a single shot.

The first tests were conducted on board the torpedo boat  in April 1941. The radar sets were produced by the Italian company SAFAR. Only 12 devices had been installed on board Italian warships by 8 September 1943, the day Italy signed an armistice with the Allies. Beginning in the spring of 1943, the recommendation of the Italian High Command was to switch the radar on only in proximity of enemy forces, after an incorrect German advisory that the British had radar warning receivers similar to the Metox. The Allies, however, did not develop such technology until 1944. In spite of this, it has been reported that the crews made a wide use of the Gufo as a search radar, omitting to mention it on the ship's logbook to avoid sanctions.

The radar was used in combat by the light cruiser  on the night of 17 July 1943, while on passage from La Spezia to Taranto, when she detected a flotilla of four British Elco motor torpedo boats five miles ahead in the strait of Messina. One of the motor boats, MTB 316, was destroyed by the cruiser's guns, and another one was seriously damaged. Twelve British seamen lost their lives.

After Italy's armistice in September 1943, all the documentation pertaining to the research and development of the "Gufo" and of its ground-based version, named "Folaga" (coot) and built by Radiomarelli, was destroyed by order of the Italian Royal Navy Command to prevent it from falling in the hands of the occupying Nazi troops. Brandimarte, who had been promoted to Lt. Commander due to his achievements in developing the radar, joined the Italian anti-fascist resistance movement and was taken prisoner and subsequently executed by the Germans in 1944.

Other Commonwealth countries

When war with Germany was believed to be inevitable, Great Britain shared its secrets of RDF (radar) with the Commonwealth dominions of Australia, Canada, New Zealand, and South Africa – and asked that they develop their own capabilities for indigenous systems. After Germany invaded Poland in September 1939, Great Britain and the Commonwealth Nations declared war with Germany. Within a short time, all four of the Commonwealth Nations had locally designed radar systems in operation, and most continued with developments throughout the war.

Australia
After Australia declared war on Germany in September 1939, the Council for Scientific and Industrial Research established the Radiophysics Laboratory (RPL) at the University of Sydney to conduct radar research. Led by John H. Piddington, their first project produced a shore-defense system, designated ShD, for the Australian Army. This was followed by the AW Mark 1, an air-warning system for the Australian Air Force. These both operated at 200 MHz (1.5 m).

War on Japan began in December 1941, and Japanese planes attacked Darwin, Northern Territory the following February. The New South Wales Railways Engineering Group was asked by the RPL to design a lightweight antenna for the air warning radar, also known as the Worledge Aerial. LW/AW Mark I.

From this, the LW/AW Mark II resulted; about 130 of these air-transportable sets were built and used by the United States and Australian military forces in the early island landings in the South Pacific, as well as by the British in Burma.

American troops arriving in Australia in 1942–43, brought many SCR-268 radar systems with them. Most of these were turned over to the Australians, who rebuilt them to become Modified Air Warning Devices (MAWDs). These 200-MHz systems were deployed at 60 sites around Australia. During 1943–44, the RPL involved a staff of 300 persons working on 48 radar projects, many associated with improvements on the LW/AW. Height-finding was added (LW/AWH), and complex displays converted it into a ground-control intercept system (LW/GCI). There was also a unit for low-flying aircraft (LW/LFC). Near the end of the war in 1945, the RPL was working on a microwave height-finding system (LW/AWH Mark II).

Canada
Of the four Commonwealth Nations, Canada had by far the most extensive wartime involvement in radar. The major responsibility was with the National Research Council of Canada (NRCC), specifically its Radio Branch headed by John Tasker Henderson. Their first effort was in developing a surface-warning system for the Royal Canadian Navy (RCN) to protect the Halifax Harbour entrance. Called Night Watchman (NW), this 200-MHz (1.5-m), 1-kW set was completed in July 1940.

In September 1940, on their trip to the United States for cooperative exchanges, the Tizard Mission visited Canada and recommended that Great Britain use Canadian personnel and facilities to supplement the British programs. Research Enterprises, Ltd. (REL), was then established to manufacture radar and optical equipment.

The next system was a ship-borne set designated Surface Warning 1st Canadian (SW1C) for corvettes and merchant ships. The basic electronics were similar to the NW, but it initially used a Yagi antenna that was turned using an automobile steering wheel. It was first tested at sea in mid-May 1941. The project engineer from the NRCC was H. Ross Smith, who remained in charge of projects for the RCN throughout the war.

In early 1942, the frequency of the SW1C was changed to 215 MHz (1.4 m) and an electric drive was added to rotate the antenna. It was known as the SW2C and produced by the REL for corvettes and mine sweepers. A lighter version, designated SW3C, followed for small vessels such as motor torpedo boats. A plan-position indicator (PPI) display was added in 1943. Several hundred SW sets were eventually produced by the REL.

For coastal defence by the Canadian Army, a 200-MHz set with a transmitter similar to the NW was developed. Designated CD, it used a large, rotating antenna atop a 70-foot wooden tower. Since the firing battalion would be some distance away, a "displace corrector" automatically compensated for this separation. The CD was put into operation in January 1942

Following the Tizard Mission meetings in Washington, it was decided that Canada would build a microwave gun-laying system for the Canadian Army. This 10-cm (3-GHz) system was designated GL IIIC, the "C" to distinguish it from similar systems being developed in America ("A") and Great Britain ("B"). (Eventually the U.S. system was the SCR-584.) A local source of magnetrons was vital, and the National Electric Company (NEC) in Montreal began manufacturing these devices.

The GL IIIC was housed in two trailers, one with a rotating cabin and one fixed. The rotating one was called the Accurate Position Finder and held the primary equipment and separate antennas with parabolic reflectors for transmitting and receiving. The other trailer carried the Zone Position Indicator, a 150-MHz (2-m) radar that found the position of all aircraft within the system's coverage.

In mid-1941, the REL received orders for 660 GL IIIC systems. In July, a very satisfactory demonstration of the prototype system was held, and by December, the first six systems had been built. During 1942 and into the next year, there were many technical and administrative problems. In September 1943, a decision was made to use the British and American systems in liberating Europe; thus, the large REL order was never filled.

Success at the Radio Branch with the 10-cm experimental set for the Army led the RCN to request a ship-borne, early-warning microwave set. A separate Microwave Section was formed and development of a 10-cm (3-GHz) set designated RX/C was initiated in September 1941. Due to many changes in requirements from the RCN, the first sets were not available until July 1943. The RX/C incorporated many of the characteristics of the SW sets, but had a PPI display and a parabolic-reflector antenna. Further sets were produced by the REL and used throughout the war.

The Admiralty in Great Britain asked about Canada's interest and capability in manufacturing 3-cm magnetrons. This led to the development of a 3-cm device by the NEC and a full 3-cm (10-GHz) radar for small crafts. In May 1942, the British Admiralty gave a formal purchase order for these developments. The set was designated Type 268 (not to be confused with the SCR-268 from the U.S. Signal Corps), and was particularly designed to detect a submarine snorkel. With extensive testing and subsequent changes, full-scale production did not start until December 1944. About 1,600 Type 268 sets were manufactured before the end of the war.

While the Canadian Army was basically satisfied with the 200-MHz CD systems, it did ask for an improvement to 10-cm operation. Since the Microwave Section was then well experienced in these systems, they easily provided a design. Before even a prototype was built, the Army gave an order to the REL for a number of sets designated CDX. Production started in February 1943, but only 19 sets were actually delivered with 5 of these going to the USSR.

In the spring of 1943, German submarines started operating just outside the Saint Lawrence Seaway – the primary ship route from Canada to Great Britain. To counter this, the Royal Canadian Air Force (RCAF) asked that 12 sets of a long-range microwave system be built. A magnetron producing 300 kW at 10.7 cm (2.8 GHz) was developed by the firm NEC. For radiating a narrow horizontal beam to sweep the sea surface, a slotted antenna 32 by 8 feet in size was designed by William H. Watson at McGill University. The system was designated MEW/AS (Microwave Early Warning Anti Submarine).

The transmitting and receiving equipment was located behind the antenna, and the assembly could be rotated at up to 6 RPM. The controls and PPI display was in a nearby fixed building. This could detect targets at up to 120-miles (196-km) range. A second version, designed for detecting high-flying aircraft, was designated MEW/HF (Height Finding). In this, the power could be switched to a smaller, rotating antenna that gave a narrow vertical beam. The RCAF put both versions of the MEW into operation at several sites in Newfoundland, Quebec, and Ontario.

In addition to the radar sets previously described, many others were designed at the NRCC's Radio Branch during the war years – a total of 30 of all types. Of these, 12 types were turned over to the REL where they were built in quantities varying from a few to hundreds; altogether, some 3,000 were produced before the REL was closed in September 1946.

New Zealand
In late 1939, the New Zealand Department of Scientific and Industrial Research (DSIR) established two facilities for RDF development – one, led by Charles Watson and George Munro (Watson-Munro) was at the Radio Section of the Central NZ Post Office in Wellington, and the other, under the responsibility of Frederick White, was at Canterbury University College in Christchurch.

The objective of the Wellington group was to develop land-based and airborne RDF sets for detecting incoming vessels and a set to assist in gun-directing at coastal batteries. Within a few months, they had converted a 180-MHz (1.6-m), 1-kW transmitter from the Post Office to be pulse-modulated and used it in a system called CW (Coastal Watching). The CW was followed by a similar, improved system called CD (Coast Defense); it used a CRT for display and had lobe switching on the receiving antenna. This was placed into service at the Devonport Naval Base at Auckland. In this same period, a partially completed ASV 200-MHz set from Great Britain was made into an airborne set for the Royal New Zealand Air Force (RNZAF). About 20 sets were built and put into service. All three of these radars were placed into service before the end of 1940.

The group at Christchurch was to develop a set for shipboard detection of aircraft and other vessels, and a companion set for directing naval gunfire. This was a smaller staff and the work went much slower, but by July 1940, they had developed an experimental VHF fire-control set and tested it on the Armed Merchant Cruiser Monowai. This was then improved to become the 430 MHz (70 cm) SWG (Ship Warning, Gunnery), and in August 1941 went into service on the Archilles and Leander, Cruisers transferred to the newly formed Royal New Zealand Navy (RNZN).

The same basic equipment was used by the Christchurch group in developing a ship-based air- and surface-warning system. The primary difference was that the SW antennas could be directed in elevation for aircraft detection. Designated SW (Ship Warning), it was usually installed together with the SWG. Eight of each type were eventually accepted by the RNZN. A number of SWGs were also built for the British fleet stationed in Singapore; some of these with their manuals were captured by the Japanese in early 1942.

After sending engineers to the Rad Lab in the United States to study their products, a project to develop mobile 10-cm (3-GHz) systems for coast-watching and surface-fire-control that might be used throughout the Pacific. With a great demand for such systems, an experimental unit was developed and tested before the end of 1942.

Designated ME, the electronics was mounted in the cabin of a 10-wheel truck and a second truck carried the power generator and workshop. Equipment was built in both Christchurch and Wellington. The radar had a single parabolic antenna was on the roof, and a plan-position indicator CRT was used, the first such in New Zealand. The first of these went into service in early 1943 in support of a U.S. torpedo-boat base in the Solomon Islands. Some of the MD radars were used to replace 200-MHz CW sets, and several systems were built for operation on RNZN minesweepers.

As the Allies progressed upward in the Pacific, a need arose for a long-range warning set that could be quickly set up following an invasion. The RDL took this as a project in late 1942, and in few months six Long-Range Air Warning (LWAW) systems were available. These operated at 100 MHz (3 m) and, like the microwave sets, were mounted in trucks. A single Yagi antenna was normally used, but there was also a broadside array that could be used when a more permanent operation was established. The range using the Yagi was near 150 km; this increased to over 200 km with the broadside.

From the start in late 1939, 117 radar sets of all types were built in New Zealand, all by small groups; no types were ever put into serial production. After 1943, little such equipment was produced in the country, and RNZN warships were then provided with British outfits to replace the earlier New Zealand sets. 

Radar systems were developed from 1939; initially New Zealand made but then (because of difficulty on sourcing components) British made. Transportable GCI radar sets  were deployed in the Pacific, including one with RNZAF personnel at the American aerodrome at Henderson Field, Guadalcanal in September 1942, where the American SCR 270-B sets could not plot heights so were inadequate against frequent Japanese night raids. In the first half of 1943 additional New Zealand radar units and staff were sent to the Pacific at the request of COMSOPAC, Admiral Halsey.

South Africa
Like in Great Britain, RDF (radar) development in South Africa emerged from a research organization centering on lightning instrumentation: the Bernard Price Institute (BPI) for Geophysical Research, a unit of the University of the Witwatersrand in Johannesburg. When Prime Minister Jan Smuts was told of this new technology, he requested that the resources of BPI be devoted to this effort for the duration of the war. Basil Schonland, a world-recognized authority on lightning detection and analysis, was appointed to head the effort.

With nothing more than copies of some "vague documents" and notes provided by New Zealand's representative at the briefings in England, Schonland and a small team started the development in late September 1939. Before the end of November, the various elements of the system were completed, all by using locally available components. These were assembled in separate vehicles for the transmitter and receiver.

The transmitter operated at 90 MHz (3.3 m) and had a power of about 500 W. The pulse was 20-μs in width and the PRF was 50 Hz, synchronized with the power-line. The receiver was super-regenerative, using type 955 and 956 Acorn tubes in the front end and a 9-MHz IF amplifier. Separate, rotatable antennas with stacked pairs of full-wave dipoles were used for transmitting and receiving. The beams were about 30 degrees wide, but the azimuth of the reflected signal was determined more precisely by using a goniometer. Pulses were displayed on the CRT of a commercial oscilloscope.

Before the end of the year, a full system had been assembled and detected a water tank at a distance of about 8 km. Improvements were made on the receiver, and the transmitter pulse-power was increased to 5 kW. Designated JB-1 (for Johannesburg), the prototype system was taken to near Durban on the coast for operational testing. There it detected ships on the Indian Ocean, as well as aircraft at ranges to 80 km.

During early 1941, six systems were deployed to East Africa and Egypt; JB systems were also placed at the four main South African ports.

An improved system, designated JB-3, was built at the BPI; the most important changes were the use of a transmit-receive device (a duplexer) allowing a common antenna, and an increase in frequency to 120 MHz (2.5 m). The range increased to 150 km for aircraft and 30 km for small ships, with a bearing accuracy of 1–2 degrees. Twelve sets of JB-3 radars began deployment around the South African coast in June 1941.

By mid-1942, British radars were available to meet all new South African needs. Thus, no further developments were made at the BPI. Most of the staff joined the military. Basil Schonland, as a Lt. Colonel in the South African Army, went to Great Britain to serve as Superintendent of the Army Operational Research Group and later the scientific advisor to Field Marshal Bernard Montgomery.

See also
 History of radar

References

World War II radars
Science and technology during World War II